This is a list of mayors of South Bend, Indiana, beginning with South Bend's incorporation as a city on May 22, 1865. William G. George served as the city’s first mayor from 1865 to 1868. Joe Kernan was mayor of South Bend from 1988 to 1997 and went on to serve as Governor of Indiana. South Bend’s eleventh mayor was Schuyler Colfax III, son of the seventeenth Vice President of the United States Schuyler Colfax II. Every mayor since 1972 has been a Democrat and the incumbent is James Mueller, having taken office on January 1, 2020.

See also
Mayoral elections in South Bend, Indiana

References 

 
South Bend
1865 establishments in Indiana